Right for the Time is an album by American country music artist Waylon Jennings, released on Justice Records, an independent label, in 1996. Most of the songs on the album, as is the case with several later Jennings releases, were written by the singer himself. Among the other tracks, a cover of Paul Simon's "The Boxer" is notable. The liner notes for the album were written by the record's producer, Randall Jamail. Right for the Time failed to chart.  "Deep in the West," a duet with Jessi Colter, was released as a single and a music video was made.

Track listing
All tracks composed by Waylon Jennings; except where indicated
"WBPT" – 3:03
"Cactus Texas" – 3:08
"The Most Sensible Thing" (Jennings, Troy Seals, Bobby Emmons) – 4:05
"The Boxer" (Paul Simon) – 3:47
"Hittin' the Bottle Again" – 4:21
"Wastin' Time" – 2:50
"Kissing You Goodbye" – 2:00
"Carnival Song" (Jeff Black) – 3:49
"Out of Jail" – 3:33
"Lines" (Jennings, Kimmie Rhodes) – 3:03
"Deep in the West" (Shake Russell) – 3:37
"Right for the Time" – 3:54
"Living Legends, Pt. II" – 3:03

Personnel
Jerry Bridges - acoustic bass, 12-string guitar, acoustic guitar, bass guitar
Jessi Colter - background vocals
Jesse Dayton - acoustic guitar, electric guitar
Jeff Hale - drums, tambourine, ocean drum
Randall Jamail - acoustic guitar
Waylon Jennings - acoustic guitar, electric guitar, lead vocals, background vocals
Shawn Jones - 12-string guitar, acoustic guitar, electric guitar, slide guitar
Fred Lawrence - Hammond organ, piano, Wurlitzer
Robby Turner - dobro, lap steel guitar, mandolin, pedal steel guitar

References

Waylon Jennings albums
1996 albums